Radford M. Neal is a professor at the Department of Statistics and Department of Computer Science  at the University of Toronto, where he holds a research chair in statistics and machine learning. He studied computer science at the University of Calgary (B.Sc. 1977, M.Sc. 1980) and at the University of Toronto (Ph.D. 1995).  He has made great contributions in the area of machine learning and statistics, where he is particularly well known for his work on Markov chain Monte Carlo, error correcting codes and Bayesian learning for neural networks. He is also known for his blog and as the developer of pqR: a new version of the R interpreter.

References

Living people
1956 births
University of Calgary alumni
Computational statisticians
University of Toronto alumni
Academic staff of the University of Toronto
Canadian statisticians
Machine learning researchers